Warsaw Public Library – Central Library of the Masovian Voivodeship is a public library serving as the main city public library of Warsaw, as well as of the Masovian Voivodeship, and one of the largest in Poland.

The library was founded in 1907 by the Public Library Society, which was formed by foremost Polish educators and intelligentsia, such as Stanisław Leszczyński, Samuel Dickstein, Ludwik Krzywicki and Stefan Żeromski. Since 1914 the library is in Koszykowa Street. At that time the institution was led by Faustyn Czerwijowski, the first chairman of the library, who served in this position till 1937. Before the outbreak of World War II the library already contained 500,000 book volumes. In January 1945 it was set ablaze by retreating Nazi German soldiers. As a result, 300,000 books were destroyed, another 100,000 were looted.

As of late 2008 the library contains 1,380,000 volumes. New books, magazines, manuscripts and other materials are being gradually added.

See also 
 List of libraries damaged during the World War II

References

Further reading 
 Kazimiera Maleczyńska, Książki i biblioteki w Polsce okresu zaborów, Książki o książce, Ossolineum, Wrocław 1987.
 Ewa Popławska-Bukało: Siedziba Biblioteki Publicznej m.st. Warszawy - Dzieje i architektura gmachu, Warszawa 2006.

External links 
 

Libraries in Warsaw
Buildings and structures in Warsaw
Library buildings completed in 1914
Public libraries in Poland